Ikutha is a semi-arid town located between Kitui and kibwezi. It is near Kibwezi town. You can find your way to Tsavo East from Ikutha town since there is a southern gate from ikutha town.

Ikutha is a settlement in Kenya's Eastern Province. Many of its inhabitants are Kamba. However, merchants say that businesses there are promising.

Education 
In Ikutha there is only two secondary schools, namely Ikutha boys secondary and Ikutha girls' secondary school. Also there is Ikutha primary and several private primary schools, polytechnics and computer colleges. It is good to note that ikutha lacks colleges given that it is now a new district with many young people looking for schools.
Many old people are illiterate.

Populated places in Eastern Province (Kenya)